Athletes from the Netherlands competed at the 1998 Winter Olympics in Nagano, Japan.

Medalists

Short track speed skating

Men

Women

Snowboarding

Men

Speed skating

Men

Women

References
Official Olympic Reports
International Olympic Committee results database
Olympic Winter Games 1998, full results by sports-reference.com

Nations at the 1998 Winter Olympics
1998
W